Jonathan (Yonatan) Yavin (born June 17, 1972), is an Israeli author of 17 books, for children, teens and adults. He is also a journalist, columnist, translator, op-ed writer and radio host. His books have been translated into Arabic, French, German, Chinese and Japanese and 2 of his children's books are scheduled to appear in English in the USA early 2023. He is the recipient of the Israeli Prime Minister literary Award 2012. As journalist, he wrote mainly for Haaretz and Yedioth Ahronoth. He also lectures and teaches creative writing.

Biography

Yavin was born in New York to renowned news anchorman Haim Yavin and wife Josepha while his father was the Israeli TV correspondent in the US. When Jonathan was 3, his family returned to Israel. At age 19 he began writing in local newspapers in Jerusalem. During his twenties he worked as a journalist in local media and as a copywriter in advertising agencies in Jerusalem, while studying for his bachelor's degree in philosophy and comparative literature at The Hebrew University. In 2001 Jonathan moved to Tel-Aviv and began writing for Ha'aretz national newspaper. At the same time he was writing his debut novel, Baba Gee. During that period, he published his debut children's book, When I grow up... ("Haci Ha'yiti Rotze Lihyot", 2002, co-written with Nevo Ziv). The book focuses on professions in a comic and down-to-earth way. Like all Yavin's children's books, it's rhymed. It was well received, reprinted more than 10 times and is still sold at bookstores.

His 2nd children book, Pumpkin the Kitten (He'chatool Dla'at) had major commercial success: It was voted for the Israeli board of Education "Book Parade" both for kindergartens and grades 1–3, translated into Arabic by the Centre for the Arab Child's Literature in Israel and was included in the board of Education's "Bookshelf" initiative, thus distributed in over 50,000 copies to schools and kindergartens in the country. This earned Pumpkin the Kitten a "Platinum Book" certification, issued by the Israel Book Association. In 2019 this book was selected for the PJ Library program in Israel and was distributed in over 140,000 additional copies, bringing total sales to over 210 thousand copies.

Yavin's debut fiction novel, Baba Gee, published in June 2004. The protagonist is a 28 year old photographer named Nadav, who feels lost and goes on a trip to India. His father, an important CEO named Eli, decides to join him. The book was well received by critics and audience alike and optioned twice for the cinema, but never produced. Next was Yavin's 3rd children book Oh, Brother ("Achla Ach", 2005), that deals a new baby brother in the family. This book earned its illustrator, Gil'ad Soffer, the annual Israel Museum commendation for Illustration.

To this point Yavin wrote 17 books: 4 novels, a writer's guide, 3 YA novels and 9 children books. One of them, Cockatoo Hairdo (Gozlim Ba-Rosh, 2017), was translated to German and French. Another, King Leo Retires, was published in China in 2019. Yavin's YA novel Anti (2010), dealing with suicide and rap music, appeared in Japanese (2019).

Yavin's 2nd novel, House-Sitter (Shemar-Bait, 2011) was key to his acclaim. It was written in a mix of biblical and 18th-19th-20th century Hebrew. It was praised by prominent authors David Grossman, Haim Be'er, A. B. Yehoshua and Aharon Meged. Following its publication, Yavin was awarded the Prime Minister Prize for Literature 2012.

He currently lives in Ramat Gan (greater Tel-Aviv area) with his wife Ravit and his three children.

Publications

Books
When I Grow Up... (Hachi Ha'iti Rotze Lihiot). Am-Oved Publishing house, 2002, children's book. 
Pumpkin the Kitten (He-Chatool Dela'at Meshane et Ha-Da'at). Am-Oved Publishing house, 2004, children's book. Reached Platinum.
"Baba Gee" (Baba Gee). Am-Oved Publishing house, 2004, fiction novel.
Oh Brother (Achla Ach) Am-Oved Publishing house, 2006, children's book. Won the Israel Museum award for illustration.
"Zehavim" (Zehavim). Am-Oved Publishing house, 2006, young adult fiction novel.
"When Dad Was Sad" (Kshe Aba Haya Atzuv), Am-Oved Publishing house, 2008, children's book.
"In the Neighbourhood" (Baschoona Shelanoo). Am-Oved Publishing house, 2010, children's book.
"Anti" (Anti). Am-Oved Publishing house, 2010, young adult fiction novel.
"House-Sitter" (Shemar Ba'it). Am-Oved Publishing house, 2011, fiction novel.
"Building a Story" (Bonim Sipur). Kinneret-Zemora-Bitan Publishers, 2012, writer's guide.
"Dori the Dragon" (Doron Ha-Derakon). Am-Oved Publishing house, 2013, children's book.
"The Misanthropist" (Ha-Mizanthrop). Kinneret-Zemora-Bitan Publishers, 2014, fiction novel.
"King Leo Retires" (Ha-Melech Ahral'e Poresh). Kinneret-Zemora-Bitan Publishers, 2015, children's book.
"Love vs. Friendship" (Ahava Neged Haveroot (Yedioth Sefarim Publishers, 2017, young adult fiction novel.
"Cockatoo Hairdo" (Gozalim Ba-Rosh"). Am-Oved Publishing house, 2017, children's book.
"A Night at the Playground" (Layla Bagina). Am-Oved Publishing house, 2021, children's book.
"Loyal to None but Himself" (Ne'eman Le'atzmo). Melel Publishing house, 2022, fiction novel.

References

Links
Jonathan Yavin's official site.
Jonathan Yavin's page on Facebook.
Jonathan Yavin's page on The Institute for the Translation of Hebrew Literature (ITHL).
Jonathan Yavin's author page in Assia literary agency.

1972 births
Living people
Hebrew University of Jerusalem alumni
Israeli male writers
Israeli journalists
Israeli children's writers
Israeli novelists
Recipients of Prime Minister's Prize for Hebrew Literary Works
Israeli satirists
Israeli thriller writers
Israeli translators
Israeli writers